Download Series Volume 6 is a live album by the rock band the Grateful Dead. It was released as a digital download on October 4, 2005.  It was recorded on March 17, 1968, at the Carousel Ballroom (which later became the Fillmore West) in San Francisco. The show features the first set closer "Turn On Your Lovelight" and the whole second set.

According to liner notes, performances from this concert were among those used to compile the layers of sound in the band's second album, Anthem of the Sun.

Volume 6 was mastered in HDCD by Jeffrey Norman.

Track listing
"Turn On Your Lovelight" (Joseph Scott, Deadric Malone) - 16:13
"That's It for the Other One" > (Jerry Garcia, Bill Kreutzmann, Bob Weir) - 9:17
"New Potato Caboose" (Bobby Petersen, Phil Lesh) - 8:26
"China Cat Sunflower" > (Robert Hunter, Garcia) - 4:42
"The Eleven" > (Hunter, Lesh) - 10:56
"Caution (Do Not Stop On Tracks)" > (Grateful Dead) - 20:54
"Feedback" (Grateful Dead) - 7:15

Personnel
Grateful Dead
Jerry Garcia – vocals, lead guitar
Mickey Hart – drums, percussion
Bill Kreutzmann – drums, percussion
Phil Lesh – vocals, electric bass
Ron "Pigpen" McKernan – vocals, organ, harmonica, percussion
Bob Weir – vocals, rhythm guitar

Production
Dan Healy – recording
Jeffrey Norman – mastering

References

06
2005 live albums